The Dialog i43 is a dual-SIM slate format smartphone designed and developed in China by Innos and marketed in Sri Lanka by Dialog Axiata that runs the Android operating system. The device was launched with Android 2.3.5 Gingerbread. The Dialog i35 is the predecessor to this phone.

Features

Services
The Dialog i43 uses Google's Android mobile operating system, which was introduced commercially in 2008. The i43 comes with Android version 2.3.5, named "Gingerbread", which became commercially available in July 2011. Gingerbread Enhanced copy/paste functionality, allowing users to select a word by press-hold, copy, and paste. It features new audio effects such as reverb, equalization, headphone virtualization, and bass boost. It includes a new download manager, giving users easy access to any file downloaded from the browser, email, or another application. It supports voice or video chat using Google Talk. User can also make video calls using the front-facing camera.

Hardware and design
The Dialog i43 is 126.9mm long, 69.5mm wide, and 10.2mm thick, with the device weighing 165 grams. It contains Qualcomm MSM8225 chipset, 1 GHz ARM Cortex A5 CPU and 512 MB of LPDDR1 SD-RAM. The device comes with 4 GB of internal storage, additionally it supports micro SD card up to 32 GB. This handset has a 4.3-inch, IPS WVGA capacitive display 480x800 pixels. It has a 5-megapixel rear camera with dual LED flash and a 0.3-megapixel front-facing camera supports for video callings. This phone has autofocus, touchfocus, geo tagging and face detection. The Dialog i43's 1630 mAh battery has 360 hours standby time or 12 hours voice talk time. This device has a proximity sensor, a light sensor and an acceleration sensor.

Carrier
It is a dual SIM phone while one is a mini SIM, the other one is a micro SIM. The mini SIM slot is carrier locked as Dialog Axiata.

References

External links
 Dialog i43
 Dialog i43 Full Review

Android (operating system) devices